Anisa Marie Mehdi is an Iraqi-Canadian film director and journalist.

She graduated from Wellesley College in 1978 and obtained her master's degree in journalism from Columbia University.

She worked as an associate producer at CBS News in New York on the news magazine series West 57th. Her most notable documentary was Inside Mecca, which she produced and directed for National Geographic television. 
As executive producer of the PBS Frontline special "Muslims", she received the 2002 Cine Golden Eagle Award.

She is currently writing a biography on her father, Dr. Mohammad T. Mehdi, an Arab American activist in the United States. In 2007, Mehdi and two other writers launched the now-defunct Arab Writers Group Syndicate.

In February 2016, she joined the editorial board of the intelligence company Stratfor. As of 1998, Mehdi lives in Maplewood, New Jersey.

Anusa Mehdi is of half Iraqi and half Canadian descent.

Filmography
 Inside Mecca (2003)
 Muslims (2002)
 Frontline (2002)
Muslims

References

External links
Official Site

Year of birth missing (living people)
Living people
Canadian expatriate film directors in the United States
Canadian expatriate journalists in the United States
Iraqi women film directors
Canadian people of Iraqi descent
Iraqi film directors
Iraqi journalists
Iraqi people of Canadian descent
People from Maplewood, New Jersey
Canadian Shia Muslims
Seton Hall University faculty
American Shia Muslims
Iraqi Shia Muslims
Canadian women film directors
Canadian television producers
Canadian women television producers
Canadian women television journalists
Iraqi women journalists
21st-century Iraqi women writers
21st-century Iraqi writers
Film directors from New Jersey